The Indus river dolphin (Platanista minor), also known as the bhulan in Urdu and Sindhi, is a species of toothed whale in the family Platanistidae. It is endemic to the Indus River Basin of Pakistan and northwestern India. This dolphin was the first discovered side-swimming cetacean. It is patchily distributed in five small, sub-populations that are separated by irrigation barrages. 

From the 1970s until 1998, the Ganges River dolphin (Platanista gangetica) and the Indus dolphin were regarded as separate species; however, in 1998, their classification was changed from two separate species to subspecies of a single species. However, more recent studies support them being distinct species. It has been named as the national mammal of Pakistan, and the state aquatic animal of Punjab, India.

Taxonomy

The Ganges river dolphin split from the Indus river dolphin during the Pleistocene, around 550,000 years ago. This species and the Indus river dolphin, were initially classified as a single species, Platanista gangetica, but in the 1970s both were split into distinct species. However, in the 1990s, both species were again grouped as a single species. However, more recent studies of genes, divergence time, and skull structure support both being distinct species. Alternative names for the Indus River Dolphin include the Indus blind dolphin, side-swimming dolphin, and bhulan.

Distribution
The Indus river dolphin presently only occurs in the Indus River system. These dolphins occupied about 3,400 km of the Indus River and the tributaries attached to it in the past. But today, its only found in one fifth of this previous range. Its effective range today has declined by 80% since 1870. It no longer exists throughout the tributaries, and its home range is only 690 km of the river. This dolphin prefers a freshwater habitat with a water depth greater than 1 meter and that have more than 700 meters squared of cross-sectional area. Today this species can only be found in the Indus River's main stem, along with a remnant population in the Beas River.

Since the two originally inhabited river systems – between the Sukkur and Guddu barrage in Pakistan's Sindh Province, and in the Punjab and Khyber Pakhtunkhwa Provinces – are not connected in any way, how they were colonized remains unknown. The river dolphins are unlikely to have travelled from one river to another through the sea route, since the two estuaries are very far apart. A possible explanation is that several north Indian rivers such as the Sutlej and Yamuna changed their channels in ancient times while retaining their dolphin populations.

Description
The Indus dolphin has the long, pointed nose characteristic of all river dolphins. The teeth are visible in both the upper and lower jaws even when the mouth is closed. The teeth of young animals are almost an inch long, thin and curved; however, as animals age the teeth undergo considerable changes and in mature adults become square, bony, flat disks. The snout thickens towards its end. The species does not have a crystalline eye lens, rendering it effectively blind, although it may still be able to detect the intensity and direction of light. Navigation and hunting are carried out using echolocation. 

The body is a brownish color and stocky at the middle. The species has a small triangular lump in place of a dorsal fin. The flippers and tail are thin and large in relation to the body size, which is about 2-2.2 meters in males and 2.4–2.6 meters in females. The oldest recorded animal was a 28-year-old male 199 centimeters in length. Mature adult females are larger than males. Sexual dimorphism is expressed after females reach about 150 cm; the female rostrum continues to grow after the male rostrum stops growing, eventually reaching approximately 20 cm longer. Calves have been observed between January and May and do not appear to stay with the mother for more than a few months. Gestation is thought to be approximately 9–10 months.

Diet 
The species feeds on a variety of crustaceans and fish, including prawns, carp, catfish, gobies, etc.

Human interaction

The Indus river dolphin has been very adversely affected by human use of the river systems in the subcontinent. Entanglement in fishing nets can cause significant damage to local population numbers. Some individuals are still taken each year and their oil and meat used as a liniment, as an aphrodisiac and as bait for catfish. Irrigation has lowered water levels throughout their ranges. Poisoning of the water supply from industrial and agricultural chemicals may have also contributed to population decline. Perhaps the most significant issue is the building of dozens of dams along many rivers, causing the segregation of populations and a narrowed gene pool in which dolphins can breed. There are currently three sub-populations of Indus dolphins considered capable of long-term survival if protected.

Conservation status
The Indus river dolphin is listed by the IUCN as endangered on their Red List of Threatened Species and by the U.S. government National Marine Fisheries Service under the U.S. Endangered Species Act. It is the second most endangered cetacean in the world. As of 2017 it is estimated that there are only about 1,800 individuals remaining (up from 1,200 estimated in 2001). A demonstrable increase in the main river population of the Indus subspecies between 1974 and 2008 may have been driven by permanent immigration from upstream tributaries, where the species no longer occurs.Today, the species is only found between the Jinnah and Kotri barrages of the Indus.

There are many threats to their survival. Reckless and extensive fishing that reduces their prey availability is a large factor. Also, they are sometimes accidentally entangled in the fishing nets which can cause fatalities. Deforestation that occurs along the river basin is causing sedimentation which degrades the dolphin's habitat. Another factor in their decline is the construction of cross-river structures such as dams and barrages. These are a problem because they cause more isolation in the already small sub-populations. Lastly, human induced water pollution is a major threat factor. This pollution is usually in the form of either industrial and human waste, or agricultural run-off containing high amounts of chemical fertilizers and poisonous pesticides. 

Studies suggest that a better understanding of this species ecology is needed in order to develop good conservation plans. Regular monitoring is also a necessity to assess the population's status and factors causing its decline. There are currently several organizations that are helping to conserve the Indus dolphin. The World Wildlife Fund (WWF) is involved in rescue missions and helping to reduce pollution in the river. A satellite tagging effort was begun in 2022. In addition, WWF Pakistan is assisting in educating the public, and have arranged training courses for many institutions. 

The species 
is protected under Appendix I of the Convention on the International Trade of Endangered Species which prohibits the commercial international trade of the species (including parts and derivatives).

See also
 South Asian river dolphin
 Project Dolphin (India)

References

Further reading

External links

River dolphins
Mammals of Pakistan
Mammals of India
National symbols of Pakistan
EDGE species
Mammals described in 1853
Taxa named by Richard Owen
Taxobox binomials not recognized by IUCN